Colin Campbell may refer to:

Scottish history
Cailean Mór (died after 1296), also known as Sir Colin Campbell, or "Colin the Great"
Sir Colin Og Campbell of Lochawe (died before 1343), Lord of Lochawe
Colin Campbell (Swedish East India Company) (1686–1757), Scottish merchant and founder of the Swedish East India Company
Colin Roy Campbell of Glenure (c. 1708–1752), also known as the "Red Fox", killed in the Appin Murder, subject of Kidnapped by Robert Louis Stevenson
Sir Colin Campbell, 1st Baron Clyde (1792–1863), Scottish soldier

Scottish nobility
Colin Campbell, 1st Earl of Argyll (c. 1433–1493), Scottish nobleman
Colin Campbell, 3rd Earl of Argyll (c. 1486–1535), Scottish nobleman and soldier
Colin Campbell, 6th Earl of Argyll (1541/46–1584), Scottish nobleman and politician
Sir Colin Campbell, 2nd Baronet (1577–1640), Scottish nobleman
Sir Colin Campbell, 1st Baronet, of Lundie (died c. 1650), Scottish noble
Colin Campbell, 7th Earl Cawdor (born 1962), Scottish earl and architect
Lord Colin Campbell (1853–1895), MP, younger son of eighth Duke of Argyll

Politics and law
Colin Campbell (probate judge) (1752–1834), lawyer, probate judge, customs official in Nova Scotia
Sir Colin Campbell (British Army officer, born 1776) (1776–1847), Governor of Nova Scotia and Ceylon
Colin Campbell (Nova Scotia politician) (1822–1881), merchant and politician in Nova Scotia, American
Colin H. Campbell (1859–1914), provincial cabinet minister in Manitoba, Canada
Colin Campbell (Ontario politician) (1901–1978), Canadian politician, Member of Parliament, president of the International Curling Federation
Colin Campbell (Scottish politician) (born 1938), former Member of the Scottish Parliament
Colin Campbell, Lord Malcolm (born 1953), Scottish judge
Colin Minton Campbell (1827–1885), British Member of Parliament for North Staffordshire
Colin P. Campbell (1877–1956), former Speaker of the Michigan House of Representatives
Colin Campbell (Australian politician) (1817–1903), pastoralist and politician in colonial Victoria

Education and academia
Colin Campbell (lawyer) (1944–2022), British academic lawyer and Vice-Chancellor of the University of Nottingham
Colin G. Campbell (born 1935), American educator, president of Wesleyan University
T. Colin Campbell (born 1934), American biochemist and nutritionist

Science
Colin Campbell (geologist) (1931–2022), British petroleum geologist
Colin Campbell (astronomer) (died 1752), Scottish astronomer

Sport
Colin Campbell (Australian sportsman) (1872–1907), Medical doctor, Australian footballer for Essendon and cricketer
Colin Campbell (footballer, born 1883) (active in 1907–1910), footballer for both Argentina and Chile
Colin Campbell (footballer, born 1918) (1918–2003), Australian footballer for Collingwood
Colin Campbell (footballer, born 1956), Scottish association football player
Colin Campbell (cricketer, born 1977), English cricketer
Colin Campbell (cricketer, born 1884) (1884–1966), Scottish-born New Zealand cricketer
Colin Campbell (field hockey) (1887–1955), British Olympic field hockey player
Colin Campbell (ice hockey, born 1953), Canadian ice hockey player, coach and executive
Colin Campbell (ice hockey, born 1991), Canadian professional ice hockey player
Colin Campbell (Olympian) (born 1946), British Olympian who competed in both the Summer and Winter Olympic games (track and field and bobsleigh)

Arts
Colen Campbell (1676–1729), Scottish neo-Palladian architect
Colin Campbell (director) (1859–1928), Scottish-born film director, writer, actor and producer
Colin Campbell (artist) (1942–2001), Canadian artist
Lady Colin Campbell (born 1949), Jamaican-born British writer and biographer
Colin Campbell (actor) (1937–2018), English actor

Others
Colin Campbell (murderer) (born 1946 or 1947), British double murderer, convicted of the cold case 1981 murder of Claire Woolterton in 2013
Colin Campbell, 1st Baron Colgrain (1866–1954), British banker
Colin Campbell (Canadian bishop) (1931–2012), Catholic bishop of Antigonish
Colin Campbell (New Zealand bishop) (born 1941), Catholic bishop of Dunedin
Sir Colin Campbell (British Army officer, born 1754) (1754–1814), British Army general
Colin Campbell (entrepreneur), Canadian 21st century serial Internet entrepreneur
Colin Campbell, first Major-Commandant of the 100th Regiment of Foot
Colin Campbell (British priest) (1863–1916), Archdeacon of Wisbech

Fiction
Colin Campbell, protagonist of The Cat Who Walks Through Walls, a 1985 novel by Robert A. Heinlein

Ships 
Sir Colin Campell of Peterhead, best known under her later name Danmark of Copenhagen